Yuri Borysovych Shvets (born 16 May 1953) is a former Soviet intelligence officer of Ukrainian origin. He was a Major in the KGB between 1980 and 1990. From April 1985 to 1987, he was a resident spy in Washington, D.C. While there, he held a cover job as a correspondent for TASS, a Soviet state-owned news agency.

Biography 
Shvets graduated in international law from the Patrice Lumumba Peoples' Friendship University (now the Peoples' Friendship University of Russia). He also graduated from the Academy of Foreign Intelligence, where he studied alongside Vladimir Putin.

Shvets reportedly recruited two key sources of political intelligence whom he referred to as "Sputnitsa", a journalist working in Washington, and "Socrates", a former aide to President Jimmy Carter with strong ties to Greece. In his 2005 book Spy Handler: Memoir of a KGB Officer, Victor Cherkashin alleges that "Socrates" was John Helmer and Sputnitsa the late New Statesman journalist Claudia Wright.

Move to America 
After publishing a book describing his exploits and ultimate falling out with the KGB, Shvets was banned from foreign travel. In 1993, he moved permanently to the United States, where he later gained citizenship.

Shvets was a key source for the book American Kompromat by Craig Unger.

Involvement with Alexander Litvinenko
In 2006, Shvets emerged as a potentially key witness in the poisoning of ex-Federal Security Service officer Alexander Litvinenko. In an interview with the BBC, broadcast on 16 December 2006, Shvets said that he and Litvinenko had compiled a report investigating the activities of senior Kremlin officials on behalf of a British company looking to invest "dozens of millions of dollars" in a project in Russia. Shvets said the dossier about Sergei Ivanov was so incriminating, it was likely that Litvinenko was murdered because of it. He said that Litvinenko had shown the dossier to another business associate, Andrei Lugovoi, who had worked for the FSB and had passed the dossier to his superiors in Moscow. Shvets was interviewed about it by Scotland Yard detectives investigating Litvinenko's murder.

References

External links
His YouTube channel
Booknotes interview with Shvets on Washington Station: My Life as a KGB Spy in America, 18 June 1995.

1952 births
KGB officers
Soviet spies
Living people
Peoples' Friendship University of Russia alumni
Ukrainian emigrants to the United States
Military personnel from Kharkiv